Esra Dalfidan is a Turkish-German jazz singer.

Career

Dalfidan was born in 1975 to Turkish parents and raised in the German industrial town of Solingen. After a brief career as a music therapist, she attended Amsterdam Conservatory in 2006. With classmates she started FIDAN, a band that combined jazz with folk music from Turkey and Azerbaijan. Dalfidan sings lyrics in English, German, and Turkish. The band's name comes from the Turkish word for twig or branch. As her main influences and source of inspiration she mentions the Azeri singer and pianist Aziza Mustafa Zadeh and the Portuguese singer Maria João. Zadeh developed a blend of jazz, modern, and Azeri traditional music called mugam jazz.

In 2008 she performed a series of concerts with the Tineke Postma Group, extending into the first half of 2009. She worked with an ensemble called Gandhi Bazaar led by Ned McGowan. This group assembled five musicians with backgrounds in jazz, classical, Indian, Turkish, and flamenco music. The Gandhi Bazaar concert tour was commissioned by the Dutch Fund for the Performing Arts and some of the compositions were created to accompany texts by the Dutch-Iranian poet Nafiss Nia.

Awards and honors
 Jugend Musiziert, 1991
 Winner, 7th Dutch Vocalists Concours, 2007
 Finalist, Deloitte Jazz Award 2008

Discography
 Colors (Challenge, 2008)
 CounterPoint (Challenge, 2010)

References

 Radio broadcast of Fidan by Dutch VPRO's Jazz@vpro, recorded 9 May 2008 during Jazz in Duketown, in De Toonzaal in Den Bosch. Broadcast on 23 May 2008. Part 1: Colors, Blue, Sen Gelmez Oldun, Straight Ahead, Endless, Bridges, Worthwhile, Gossip, Yalgizam. (Music starts at 4:00) Part 2: Yalgizam, Everlasting Asking
 Portrait of Esra in Solinger Tageblatt, 15 May 2008

External links

 Official site

1975 births
Living people
German people of Turkish descent
Scat singers
German jazz singers
21st-century German women singers